Associação de Estudantes do Instituto Superior de Agronomia or Agronomia is a Portuguese multisports club for Instituto Superior de Agronomia students. Agronomia has won two Campeonato Nacional Honra/Super Bock and nine Taça de Portugal de Rugby. It is one of the oldest rugby clubs in Portugal. Three players were represented the club at the 2007 Rugby World Cup finals.

On 18 February 2012 the club won the Taça de Portugal de Rugby for the ninth time.

Achievements
Campeonato Nacional Honra/Super Bock:
Winner (2): 2006–2007, 2018/19
Taça de Portugal de Rugby:
Winner (10):1978, 1998, 1999, 2000, 2006, 2009, 2010, 2011, 2012, 2017
Taça Ibérica:
Winner (1):2008
Supertaça de Portugal de Rugby:
Winner (4):1998, 2007, 2011, 2016

References

External links
 Website

University and college sports clubs in Portugal
Portuguese rugby union teams
Sports clubs established in 1935
Rugby clubs established in 1935
1935 establishments in Portugal
Sport in Lisbon